Taste of Love is a South Korea reality show program on TV Chosun. Season 1 was televised on TV Chosun every Thursday at 23:00 (KST) starting from September 16, 2018, and ended  February 22, 2019.  Season 2 started broadcast on 23 May 2019.

Synopsis 
In the show, a celebrity and non-celebrity date for 100 days, under contract. After the 100 days has passed, the couple decide whether they want to continue dating or not.

Main MC

Fixed Panelist MC

Cast

Season 1

Season 2

Season 3

Ratings 
 Ratings listed below are the individual corner ratings of Taste of Love. (Note: Individual corner ratings do not include commercial time, which regular ratings include.)

Season 1

Season 2

Season 3

Notes

References

External links 
 Official Website for Season 1 
 Official Website for Season 2 
 Official Website for Season 3 

South Korean variety television shows
South Korean television shows
Korean-language television shows
2018 South Korean television series debuts
South Korean reality television series